Metalton is an unincorporated community in southern Carroll County, Arkansas United States. The community is located on Arkansas Highway 21 between Cabanal to the north and Omega to the south. The communities of Rudd and Gobbler lie to the southeast along Arkansas Highway 103. The community lies near the intersection of Piney Creek with its tributary Cedar Creek.

The Metalton post office was established in 1898 and served until 1967.

References

Unincorporated communities in Carroll County, Arkansas
Unincorporated communities in Arkansas